The 2013–14 CCHL season was the 53rd season of the Central Canada Hockey League (CCHL). The twelve teams of the CCHL played 62-game schedules.

Come March, the top teams of the league played down for the Bogart Cup, the CCHL championship.  The winner of the Bogart Cup competed in the Eastern Canadian Junior "A" championship, the Fred Page Cup.  If successful against the winners of the Quebec Junior AAA Hockey League and Maritime Hockey League, the champion would then move on to play in the Canadian Junior Hockey League championship, the 2014 Royal Bank Cup.

Changes 
Kanata Stallions become Kanata Lasers mid-season (January 2014)

Current standings 
Note: GP = Games played; W = Wins; L = Losses; OTL = Overtime losses; SL = Shootout losses; GF = Goals for; GA = Goals against; PTS = Points; x = clinched playoff berth; y = clinched division title.

Teams listed on the official league website.

Standings listed on official league website.

2014 Bogart Cup Playoffs

Playoff results are listed on the official league website.

Fred Page Cup Championship
Hosted by the St. Jerome Panthers in Saint-Jerome, Quebec.  The Carleton Place Canadians represented the league at the event and won it.

Round Robin
Carleton Place Canadians 6 - St-Jérôme Panthers (QJAAAHL) 4
Carleton Place Canadians 4 - Granby Inouk (QJAAAHL) 2
Carleton Place Canadians 2 - Truro Bearcats (MHL) 1

Final
Carleton Place Canadians 3 - St-Jérôme Panthers (QJAAAHL) 1

2014 Royal Bank Cup
Hosted by the Vernon Vipers in Vernon, British Columbia. The Carleton Place Canadians represented the CCHL and Eastern Canada and finished in the second, with an overtime loss in the final.

Round Robin
Carleton Place Canadians 3 - Vernon Vipers (BCHL) 2
Dauphin Kings (MJHL) 4 - Carleton Place Canadians 3 OT
Carleton Place Canadians 4 - Toronto Lakeshore Patriots (OJHL) 2
Yorkton Terriers (SJHL) 3 - Carleton Place Canadians 1
Semi-final
Carleton Place Canadians 5 - Dauphin Kings (MJHL) 3
Final
Yorkton Terriers (SJHL) 4 - Carleton Place Canadians 3 OT

Scoring leaders 
Note: GP = Games played; G = Goals; A = Assists; Pts = Points; PIM = Penalty minutes

Leading goaltenders 
Note: GP = Games played; Mins = Minutes played; W = Wins; L = Losses: OTL = Overtime losses; SL = Shootout losses; GA = Goals Allowed; SO = Shutouts; GAA = Goals against average

Players selected in 2014 NHL Entry Draft
Rd 7 #189 Kelly Summers - Ottawa Senators (Carleton Place Canadians)

Awards
Most Valuable Player - Andy Sturtz (Carleton Place)
Most Sportsmanlike - Ryan Collins (Ottawa)
Leading Scorer - Andy Sturtz (Carleton Place)
Top Rookie - Neil Doef (Smiths Falls)
Top Graduating Player - Victor Beaulac (Smiths Falls)
Top Defenceman - Victor Beaulac (Smiths Falls)
Top Prospect - Kelly Summers (Carleton Place)
Top Goaltender - Guillaume Therien (Carleton Place)
Top Coach - Jason Clarke (Carleton Place)
Top General Manager - Jason Clarke (Carleton Place)
Lowest GAA - Guillaume Therien and Justin Laforest (Carleton Place)
Nielsen-Peckett Award - Alex Stothart (Kanata)
All-Rookie Team - Neil Doef (Smiths Falls), Zach Senychyn (Smiths Falls), Matt Foget (Gloucester), Kris Myllari (Kanata), Andrew Peski (Brockville), Doug Johnston (Gloucester)
All-Academic Team - Alex Stothart (Kanata), Bobby Williams (Cumberland), Michael Vered (Nepean), Ryan Kuffner (Gloucester), Alex Row (Kemptville), Michael Pinios (Smiths Falls)

See also 
 2014 Royal Bank Cup
 Fred Page Cup
 Quebec Junior AAA Hockey League
 Maritime Junior Hockey League
 2013 in ice hockey
 2014 in ice hockey

References

External links 
 Official website of the Central Hockey League
 Official website of the Canadian Junior Hockey League

CCHL
2013